Novoberezovsky is a rural locality (a settlement) in Krasnoarmeyskoye Rural Settlement, Novonikolayevsky District, Volgograd Oblast, Russia. The population was 52 as of 2010. There are 3 streets.

Geography 
Novoberezovsky is located in steppe, on the Khopyorsko-Buzulukskaya Plain, 60 km northeast of Novonikolayevsky (the district's administrative centre) by road. Lazorevsky is the nearest rural locality.

References 

Rural localities in Novonikolayevsky District